Preah Netr Preah  is a town and seat of Preah Netr Preah  District in Banteay Meanchey Province in north-western Cambodia.

Towns in Cambodia
Preah Netr Preah District
Populated places in Banteay Meanchey province